The 2005–06 Divizia D was the 64th season of the Liga IV, the fourth tier of the Romanian football league system. The champions of each county association play against one from a neighboring county in a play-off match played on a neutral venue. The winners of the play-off matches promoted to 2006–07 Liga III.

Promotion play-off 

The matches was scheduled to be played on 17 June 2006.

|}

County leagues

Arad County

Covasna County

Galați County

Mureș County 

Championship play-off 

Championship play-out

Neamț County

Suceava County

Vâlcea County

Vrancea County 
 Championship final  

Șoimii Nisprod Mircești won the 2005–06 Divizia D Vrancea County and qualify to promotion play-off in Liga III.

See also 
 2005–06 Divizia A
 2005–06 Divizia B

References

External links
 FRF

Liga IV seasons
4
Romania